Rissoina harryleei is a species of minute sea snail, a marine gastropod mollusk or micromollusk in the family Rissoinidae.

Description

Distribution
This species occurs in the Atlantic Ocean off the Bermudas.

References

Rissoinidae
Gastropods described in 2009